Atlee or Atlee Station is an unincorporated community in central Hanover County in the Mid-Atlantic state of Virginia, United States.

History
Atlee was known for its two train stops and more than likely its namesake came from a delegate to the state legislature who lived in the area, Jacob S. Atlee. There were two stations, West and East Atlee. In 1921 they were combined. Until 1931, there was a telegraph office also. In 1947 Atlee was a flag stop until 1960. In the late 1950s, the C&O railroad petitioned the State Corporation Commission for authority to stop freight handling at Atlee.

Urban sprawl
The Atlee area was mostly rural until the 1980s. Interstate 295 was constructed through the area in the early 1980s, while the widening of U.S. Route 301 from a 2 lane highway to a 4 lane divided highway in the late 1960s paved the way for master-planned developments such as King's Charter. Atlee is one of the fastest-growing communities in Hanover County and has one of the top school districts in the Commonwealth. Atlee is also home to one of the highest median household income zip code 23116, in the commonwealth. Many residents in the area work in Richmond or commute to northern Virginia or Washington D.C. due to Hanover County's central location and three major thoroughfares: U.S. Route 301, Interstate 95, U.S. Route 1 and the to-be-built high speed rail in nearby Ashland.

References

External links
"Atlee" at Chesapeake & Ohio Piedmont Subdivision website

Unincorporated communities in Hanover County, Virginia
Unincorporated communities in Virginia